Randolph Jefferson (October 1, 1755 – August 7, 1815) was the younger brother of Thomas Jefferson, the only male sibling to survive infancy. He was a planter and owner of the Snowden plantation that he inherited from his father. He served the local militia for about ten years, making captain of the local militia in 1794. He also served during the Revolutionary War.

Randolph, known as "Uncle Randolph" when he visited Monticello, was considered as a candidate for the father of Sally Hemings's children following DNA studies that found that the Hemings children descended from the Jefferson line. The theory that Randolph Jefferson fathered Hemings children is discounted by the Thomas Jefferson Foundation given that records do not show that Randolph often visited Monticello. He often socialized with the enslaved people during his visits. His son, Isham Randolph Jefferson, who lived at Monticello during his childhood is another alternate candidate for Hemings children's paternity. Thomas Jefferson, though, was found by The Monticello Jefferson-Hemings Report (2000) to be the likely father of Sally Hemings' children. Other scholars contend otherwise and find Randolph an attractive candidate.

Early life 
Born at Shadwell, the Jefferson family plantation in Albemarle County, Virginia, his parents were Peter Jefferson, who died when Randolph was two years old, and Jane Randolph Jefferson. He was a twin to Anne Scott Jefferson and the only male sibling of Thomas Jefferson's to survive infancy. The twins were Thomas' youngest siblings, about 13 years younger than him. After Peter Jefferson's death, and while Randolph was a child, his affairs were managed by John Harvie Sr., the executor of Peter Jefferson's estate. After he died, his brother Thomas managed his affairs, such as his education and property, until he came of age in 1776. He assisted in management of his younger brother's affairs after 1776.

In 1764 and 1765, Randolph Jefferson studied with Ben Snead at the residence of his uncle Charles Lewis, Jr. and aunt Mary Randolph Lewis at Buck Island, which was a 960-acre tract located near Monticello and the Rivanna River in Albemarle County. He lived again at Shadwell with his mother in 1769, when he was taught by Patrick Morton. In 1770, the main house at Shadwell was destroyed in a fire, and his mother, Jane Randolph Jefferson, had a house built there as a replacement. He left Shadwell for Williamsburg when he was 16 to reside and study at the College of William & Mary from October 1771 until September 1772. He attended The Grammar School at the College of William & Mary and was tutored in higher subjects by Thomas Gwatkin, who taught mathematics and natural philosophy at the college.  Additionally, he took violin lessons from Frances Alberti, as did his brother. Randolph Jefferson continued to “fiddle” throughout his life and willed his violin to his son, Robert Lewis Jefferson.

Description 
Thomas Jefferson described Randolph posthumously in a deposition that was taken as Randolph's sons contested the will that favored their stepmother, Mitchie Pryor Jefferson.
 Thomas was considerate and affectionate toward Randolph; they addressed each other as "Dear Brother," and exchanged visits and services with each other. Letters document that Thomas lent Randolph the harness for a gig, had his watch repaired, gave him a dog, sent him vegetable seeds, and gave him a spinning jenny. At Monticello, he was called "Uncle Randolph". A former Monticello enslaved man, Isaac Jefferson, recalled in 1847 that Randolph "used to come out among black people, play the fiddle and dance half the night..."

Historian Dumas Malone states that Randolph did not share his older brother's eloquence. His letters to Thomas show a disregard of grammar and the use of colloquialisms such as "tech" instead of "touch." His "rustic sense of humor" may have caused people to underestimate his intelligence, yet he lacked his brother's intellectual curiosity.

Military service

In 1776, Randolph Jefferson served in Captain Wingfield's Company of the Albemarle militia. He served with William Fossett and Joseph Nielson who had worked at Monticello and had live-in relationships with members of the Hemings family. He was a member of the local militia in 1779.

Along with his brother, Jefferson signed an Oath of Allegiance to the Commonwealth of Virginia in 1777, He, his brother, and Charles Lewis also signed the Albemarle County Oath of Allegiance to the Commonwealth on April 21, 1779. It was also called the Albemarle Declaration of Independence.

During the Revolutionary War (1775–1783), he served under General Thomas Nelson with the Virginia Light Dragoons. In the fight against Tarleton, in the summer of 1781, he provided provisions for the Virginia troops, volunteered a slave from Snowden to help move items from military stores at Scotts Ferry in Albemarle County to Bedford County, and allowed the 3rd Regiment of Light Dragoons to camp at Snowden for over a month and a half.

Following the war, Jefferson served in the Buckingham County Militia, achieving the rank of Lieutenant in 1787 and, in 1794, was recommended to rank of Captain. After at least nine years of service in the Militia, Randolph's reason for not continuing remains a mystery. He was content to enjoy the title of Captain the remainder of his life.

Plantation owner

In 1776, Randolph inherited the Snowden plantation in Buckingham County, Virginia. with 2,291⅔ acres called "Fluvanna lands" located near the Hardware River and Scottsville, from his father, Peter Jefferson's estate. More specifically, the plantation was located along the James River, about twenty miles south of Monticello and across from Scott's Ferry and on the south side of Horseshoe Bend. His life at Snowden was relatively simple compared to life at Monticello; however, he was an affluent planter and dependent on enslaved labor. He had 2,000 acres, 30 slaves, 6 horses, and 42 cattle in 1782. Months after Randolph's death, the dwelling house at Snowden burned to the ground.  Ultimately, none of Randolph Jefferson's sons could afford to purchase Snowden from their father's estate and it was sold to Capt. John Harris of Albemarle County. Most of them, eventually settled nearby in Scottsville, Albemarle and Fluvanna County, Virginia.

Marriage and family
On July 30, 1781, Jefferson married his first cousin, Anne Lewis, the daughter of Colonel Charles Lewis of Buck Island and Mary Randolph, the sister of Jane Randolph Jefferson.  Isham Randolph of Dungeness was the grandfather of both Randolph Jefferson and Anne Jefferson Lewis. They had six children: Thomas, Robert Lewis, Peter Field, Isham Randolph, James Lilburne and Anna Scott. Anna Scott Jefferson, nicknamed Nancy, married Hastings Mark.

Randolph was a widower for about ten years after his wife died about 1799. He periodically suffered from ill health beginning in 1807, which precluded his ability to travel at times.  Randolph remarried about 1809 to Mitchie Ballow Pryor of Buckingham County, who did not get along with her stepsons and convinced Randolph to favor her in a rewrite of his will that was dated May 28, 1808. Mitchie, whose father was David Pryor, was in her early twenties, perhaps not yet age 21, when she married Randolph, who was in his mid-50s. She created disruption within the Jefferson family, including communicating her concerns about Randolph's management of the Snowden estate with her brother-in-law, Thomas Jefferson. She was also prone to heavy spending, responsible for large bills with local merchants. She conceived a son named John before Randolph died at Snowden on August 17, 1815. Randolph suffered an illness in the Spring of 1815, but told his brother in June of that year that he was feeling fine and was involved in the wheat harvest. Randolph's sons and Thomas Jefferson tried to break Randolph's last will, which favored Mitchie. Mitchie and John then moved to Tennessee, where John died unmarried at age 29. Randolph's will called for his property to be sold and the funds divided up among his sons and his slaves were to stay with the family.

Suggested paternity of Sally Hemings's children

The Jefferson–Hemings controversy concerns the question of whether U.S. President Thomas Jefferson was the father of the children of Sally Hemings, a mixed-race slave. Alternate theories suggest that Randolph Jefferson, or his nephew, Peter Carr, fathered the Hemings children. Carr, though, was ruled out in genetic testing — but there was a match to the Jefferson male line to descendants of Sally Hemings' son Eston. 

The DNA study, published in Nature on November 5, 1998, titled Jefferson Fathered Slave's Last Child, led to speculation about whether Randolph was the Jefferson who fathered the Hemings children. The Thomas Jefferson Heritage Society, formed in 1999, commissioned its own independent scholars' report that was completed in 2001. While the report suggested that Randolph Jefferson, or one of his sons, could have fathered Hemings's children, it is more likely that Thomas Jefferson was the father. Noting that Thomas Jefferson invited Randolph to Monticello 15 days before Eston's estimated date of conception, that an oral tradition among Eston's descendants identified their ancestor not as Thomas Jefferson, but rather as an "uncle" (at Monticello Randolph was called "Uncle Randolph"), that enslaved Monticello blacksmith Isaac Jefferson reported that Randolph socialized with the Monticello slaves, and that Randolph (a widower at the time of Eston's conception) was reported to have fathered children with other enslaved women, a 13-member Scholars' Commission chaired by University of Virginia Law School professor Robert F. Turner concluded in a report issued in April 2001, that Randolph was likely the father of Eston Hemings.

See also
 Ancestry of Thomas Jefferson (also Randolph's ancestors)

Notes

References

Further reading
Brodie, Fawn M. (1974) Thomas Jefferson: An Intimate History 
Cunningham, Noble E., Jr. (1987) In Pursuit of Reason: The Life of Thomas Jefferson 
Gordon-Reed, Annette [1997] (1999) Thomas Jefferson and Sally Hemings: An American Controversy, reprint 1999 with response to DNA results
 
Malone, Dumas (1977) Jefferson and His Time: The Sage of Monticello 
 
 
 

1755 births
1815 deaths
American people of English descent
American planters
College of William & Mary alumni
Jefferson family
People from Buckingham County, Virginia
Randolph family of Virginia
American slave owners
People from Albemarle County, Virginia